Alexander McCulloch (c. 1809 - 15 October 1890) was an Australian politician who represented the South Australian House of Assembly seat of The Burra from 1866 to 1868.

References

Members of the South Australian House of Assembly
1809 births
1890 deaths
19th-century Australian politicians